The 1904 Purdue Boilermakers football team was an American football team that represented Purdue University during the 1904 Western Conference football season. In their second season under head coach Oliver Cutts, the Boilermakers compiled a 9–3 record, finished in sixth place in the Western Conference with a 1–2 record against conference opponents, and outscored all opponents by a total of 176 to 66. D. M. Allen was the team captain.

Schedule

References

Purdue
Purdue Boilermakers football seasons
Purdue Boilermakers football